Club Trouville is a multi-sport club based in Montevideo, Uruguay. The club is mainly known for its professional basketball section, which plays in the Liga Uruguaya de Básquetbol, the first level of Uruguayan basketball. Other sports practiced are rugby union and association football.

History
The club has uncertain origins: its foundation date of April 1, 1922 was established during a meeting among club associates in 1954 after internal research. It owns its name to Plaza Trouville, a square in the Pocitos neighbourhood of Montevideo. The club was affiliated to the Uruguayan Basketball Federation in 1928, and was first promoted to the top level in 1931; in 1945 the team won the Federal championship. After the creation of the Liga Uruguaya de Básquetbol in 2003, the team has played in the league in all of its seasons, winning the league title in 2006, beating Aguada in the final series. Trouville finished second in the 2014–15 LUB, losing to Malvín in the finals. The club has also played at international level, and participated in the Liga Sudamericana de Básquetbol in 2004, 2005, 2008, 2015 and 2016.

The rugby union section has won the Campeonato Uruguayo de Rugby in 1954, 1956 and 1958.

Notable players 

 Gabriel Abratanski
 Martín Aguilera
 Esteban Batista
 Miguel "Ali" Berdiel
 Nicolás Borsellino
 Marcel Bouzout
 Hernando Cáceres
 Claudio Charquero
 Néstor Colmenares
 Juan Ducasse
 J. R. Giddens
 Sebastián Izaguirre
 Joaquín Izuibejeres
 Pablo Morales
 Reque Newsome
 Luis Pierri
 Paolo Quinteros
 Juliano Rivera
 Sebastián Shaw
 Juan Pablo Silveira
 Emilio Taboada
 Santiago Vidal
 Gonzalo Soto

References

External links 

 

Basketball teams in Uruguay
Basketball teams in Montevideo
Basketball teams established in 1922
1922 establishments in Uruguay